The Cal Poly Pomona Broncos men's basketball team is the college basketball program representing California State Polytechnic University, Pomona (Cal Poly Pomona). The Broncos play in the California Collegiate Athletic Association (CCAA) in NCAA Division II.

Cal Poly Pomona won its first NCAA championship in 2010 and has appeared in 14 NCAA Tournaments. It has been described to as a "powerhouse" due to its strong historical record.

The Broncos presently play their home games in Kellogg Gymnasium, with a capacity of 4,765 for basketball.

Record versus current conference rivals

The Broncos have a combined all-time record of 1,046-852 (.551) as of the 2016-17 season .

All-Americans

Eight Broncos have been named All-Americans in school history,

1962-63
     Bill Leedom, Third Team
1965-66
     Paul Scranton, Third Team
1971-72
     Alan Smith, Honorable Mention
1972-73
     Terry Ross, Second Team
2004-05
     Jeff Bonds, NABC
2008-09
     Larry Gordon, NABC, Division II Bulletin
2012-13
     Mitchel Anderson, NABC
2014-15
     Terrence Drisdom, NABC

Broncos overseas

 Angelo Tsagarakis: France, Greece (2008–present)
 Jeff Bonds: Spain, Great Britain (2005-?)
 Larry Gordon: Austria, Germany, Kazakhstan (2010–present)
 Matthew Rosser: Philippines (2012–Present)
 Tobias Jahn: Germany (2012–Present)
 Terrence Drisdom: Japan (2017–Present)
 William Christmas: Germany (2021–Present)

See also
Cal Poly Pomona Broncos

References